There are several rivers named Lajeado River.

Brazil
 Lajeado River (Maranhão)
 Lajeado River (Paraná)
 Lajeado River (Tocantins)

See also 
 Lajeado (disambiguation)